Harry Wilkinson (21 October 1909 – 30 May 1971) was an English professional rugby league footballer who played in the 1930s and 1940s.

Playing career
Harry Wilkinson was born in Sharlston, Wakefield, West Riding of Yorkshire, England, following his retirement from playing rugby league he became the bagman at Wakefield Trinity , and he died aged 61 in Wakefield, West Riding of Yorkshire, England.

International honours
Harry Wilkinson, won caps for England while at Wakefield Trinity in 1943 against Wales, in 1944 against Wales, in 1945 against Wales, and in 1946 against France.

County Honours
Harry Wilkinson was selected for Yorkshire County XIII while at Wakefield Trinity during the 1945/46 and 1946/47 seasons.

Challenge Cup Final appearances
Harry Wilkinson played  left-, i.e. number 8, in Wakefield Trinity's 13-12 victory over Wigan in the 1946 Challenge Cup Final during the 1945–46 season at Wembley Stadium, London on Saturday 4 May 1946, in front of a crowd of 54,730.

County Cup Final appearances
Harry Wilkinson played  in Wakefield Trinity's 0-8 defeat by Leeds in the 1932 Yorkshire County Cup Final during the 1932–33 season at Fartown Ground, Huddersfield on Saturday 19 November 1932, played  in the 5-5 draw with Leeds in the 1934 Yorkshire County Cup Final during the 1934–35 season at Crown Flatt, Dewsbury on Saturday 27 October 1934, played  in the 2-2 draw with Leeds in the 1934 Yorkshire County Cup Final replay during the 1934–35 season at Fartown Ground, Huddersfield on Wednesday 31 October 1934, played  in the 0-13 defeat by Leeds in the 1934 Yorkshire County Cup Final second replay during the 1934–35 season at Parkside, Hunslet on Wednesday 7 November 1934, played  left-, i.e. number 8, in the 2-9 defeat by York in the 1936 Yorkshire County Cup Final during the 1936–37 season at Headingley Rugby Stadium, Leeds on Saturday 17 October 1936, played left- in the 9-12 defeat by Featherstone Rovers in the 1940 Yorkshire County Cup Final during the 1939–40 season at Odsal Stadium, Bradford on Saturday 22 June 1940, played left- in the 2-5 defeat by Bradford Northern in the 1945 Yorkshire County Cup Final during the 1945–46 season at Thrum Hall, Halifax on Saturday 3 November 1945, played left- in the 10-0 victory over Hull F.C. in the 1946 Yorkshire County Cup Final during the 1946–47 season at Headingley Rugby Stadium, Leeds on Saturday 31 November 1946, played left- in the 7-7 draw with Leeds in the 1947 Yorkshire County Cup Final during the 1947–48 Northern season at Fartown Ground, Huddersfield on Saturday 1 November 1947, and played  left-, and scored a try in the 8-7 victory over Leeds in the 1947 Yorkshire County Cup Final replay during the 1947–48 Northern season at Odsal Stadium, Bradford on Wednesday 5 November 1947.

Notable tour matches
Harry Wilkinson played  in Wakefield Trinity's 6-17 defeat by Australia in the 1933–34 Kangaroo tour of Great Britain match during the 1933–34 season at Belle Vue, Wakefield on Saturday 28 October 1933.

Career records
Harry Wilkinson holds Wakefield Trinity's "Most Career Appearances" record with 605 appearances, and Wakefield Trinity's "Most Consecutive Appearances" record with 96 appearances between 1939 and 1942.

References

External links

1909 births
1971 deaths
England national rugby league team players
English rugby league players
People from Sharlston
Rugby league locks
Rugby league props
Rugby league players from Wakefield
Wakefield Trinity captains
Wakefield Trinity players
Yorkshire rugby league team players